Atef Helmy Nagib (born 23 April 1950) is an Egyptian communication and technology expert and the former minister of communications and information technology.

Early life and education 
Atef Helmy was born in Cairo in 1950. He holds a Bachelor of Science in Communication and Electrical Engineering having graduated with Honors from the Military Technical College in 1973. He also received a diploma in Computer Science from the Faculty of Engineering, Ain Shams University in 1979 and a master's degree in Information Technology also from the Faculty of Engineering, Ain Shams University in 1982.

Career
Helmy was appointed as a teaching assistant in the Military Technical College upon graduation in 1973 and immediately joined the war effort with the Egyptian Armed Forces during the 1973 war. He continued to serve in the armed forces in the field of communications and information technology from 1973 to 1983.

In 1983, Helmy resigned from the armed forces and travelled to Abu Dhabi, United Arab Emirates to join NCR and grew his career within the company until he became General Manager of NCR Dubai. Helmy moved to Egypt in 1996 to establish Oracle Egypt and lead it as its Managing Director. In 2005, he launched, in Cairo, one of Oracle's largest global support centers, which was a key reference that portrayed Egypt as one of the top destinations for outsourcing and offshoring, bringing Oracle's total workforce in Egypt to over 800 professionals. He retired from Oracle in 2006 and subsequently founded Prime Business Consulting in 2007. Helmy also undertook several public roles in the ICT sector, including chairman of the Egyptian Chamber of Communications & Information Technology (CIT).

Political career
Helmy served as Egypt's Minister of Communications & Information Technology from January 2013 to March 2015, first as one of the independent members of the Qandil cabinet, and then subsequently served in the cabinets of Hazem El Biblawy and Ibrahim Mahlab

As ICT Minister, Helmy chaired the Boards of the National Telecommunications Regulatory Authority (NTRA), the Information Technology Industry Development Agency (ITIDA), and the National Telecommunication Institute (NTI). He also chaired the Board of Trustees of the Information Technology Institute (ITI), the Technology Innovation and Entrepreneurship Center (TIEC), and oversaw the institutional development of Egypt Post.

Helmy was responsible for the National ICT Strategy 2013-2020 which envisioned Egypt's transformation into the global digital economy, and spearheaded several national initiatives to achieve this goal, namely:

 عاطفCreating the necessary infrastructure to make Egypt the Internet Digital Hub of the Region
 عاطفDeveloping a national integrated digital platform (Digital Society) to contribute to sustainable socio-economic development, and
 عاطفSupporting the ICT industry development and job creation through fostering innovation and attracting FDI

Helmy also participated in the following major projects that:

 Broadband Initiative
 Digital Dividend
 Unified Telecom License
 The new Infrastructure Company
 Cloud Computing
 Mobile Money & Financial Inclusion
 Technology Parks
New Suez Canal ICT Infrastructure and services
 Government to Citizens (G2C) digital services
 local manufacturing of smart meters, smartphones and tablets
 establishment of enabling ecosystem to enhance education, healthcare and other sectors through technology

Resignation 
Helmy and three other ministers of Qandil Cabinet resigned from office on 1 July due to government's reaction to mass demonstrations in the country. He was again appointed minister of communications and information technology on 16 July 2013 to the interim cabinet led by Hazem Al Beblawi.

Post-ministry career 
Atef Helmy was appointed as chairman of the board of Orange Egypt from April 2016 to April 2017. Additionally, he has focused his post-ministry to development activities in Egypt, Africa, and the Arab world, through the following roles:

 Chairman, Prime Business Consulting
 Senior Advisor, Orange Middle East & Africa (OMEA)
 Ambassador of Orange to the Smart Africa Alliance
 Board Member, SAMENA Council
 Founding Member, Arab Federation for Digital Economy
 Founding Member, Egypt Fintech Association
 Honorary Member, American Chamber of Commerce
 Member, Board of Trustees, British University in Egypt
 Member, Board of Trustees, Beit El Zakat (Egypt House of Alms & Charity)
 Board Member, Al Mohandes Insurance
 Board Member, Al Hayat Insurance

Awards and recognition 

 Atef Helmy was appointed as Chairman of the World Summit for Information Societies (WSIS+10) high-level event in Geneva in June 2014 Youtube interview
 Helmy was also awarded the Golden Medallion from the International Telecommunication Union (ITU) during the event

Personal life 
Helmy is married and has 3 children and 8 grandchildren.

References

Communications Ministers of Egypt
Living people
1950 births
Egyptian chief executives
Qandil Cabinet
Beblawi Cabinet
20th-century Egyptian engineers
21st-century Egyptian engineers
Egyptian electrical engineers